John Kevin Boland (born April 25, 1935) is an Irish-born American prelate of the Roman Catholic Church. Boland served as bishop of the Diocese of Savannah in Georgia from 1995 to 2011.

Biography

Early life
John Kevin Boland was born in Monkstown, County Cork, Ireland on April 25, 1935, to John Joseph and Gertrude O’Brien. His brother, Raymond Boland, served as bishop of the Diocese of Kansas City-Saint Joseph in Missouri. John Boland attended Christian Brothers College in Cork, Ireland and All Hallows Seminary in Dublin.

Priesthood 
On June 14, 1959, Boland was ordained to the priesthood for the Diocese of Savannah by Archbishop John McQuaid in Dublin.  In September 1959, Boland arrived in Georgia to assume the position of assistant pastor at St. Mary on the Hill Parish in Augusta, Georgia.  In 1961, he was posted as associate pastor at the Cathedral of St. John the Baptist Parish in Savannah, remaining there until 1962.  Boland  attended the Catholic University of America in Washington D.C. part-time for his master's degree between 1962 and 1964.

Boland was appointed pastor in 1967 of St. Michael Parish in Tybee Island, Georgia, staying there until 1968.  In 1970, he returned to the Cathedral of St. John the Baptist Parish as rector.  Boland moved in 1972 to Blessed Sacrament Parish in Savannah.  In 1974, Boland attended the Pontifical North American College in Rome in its continuing education program.

In 1983, Boland became pastor of St. Anne Parish in Columbus, Georgia. While there, he attended summer programs for three years at Fordham University in New York City to obtain his master's degree in 1989.

Bishop of Savannah
On February 7, 1995, Pope John Paul II appointed Boland as bishop of the Diocese of Savannah. His episcopal ordination by Archbishop John Donoghue took place on April 18, 1995, at the Cathedral of St. John the Baptist in Savannah.

Boland was a member of the Pastoral Practices Committee of the United States Conference of Catholic Bishops (USCCB). He served on the board of the Southeast Pastoral Institute in Miami, Florida. He was Region IV representative to the USCCB Administrative Committee and a member of the USCCB Communications Committee. In November 2001, he was named chair of the Committee on Marriage and Family Life. In November 2002, Boland became a member of the USCCB Budget and Finance Committee. Boland is currently a board member of the All Hallows Missionary College Fund and a trustee for Catholic Mutual Group.

In 2003, Boland wrote a letter to the Chicago Province of the Society of Jesus, expressing concerns about Donald J. McGuire, a Jesuit priest known for running youth retreats in Georgia.  Boland was forwarding the complaints of a Georgia couple whose son had attended one retreat. The boy told his parents that McGuire had shown him pornography and shared his bed with him.  A few years later, McGuire was convicted of child sexual abuse and sentenced to 25 years in prison. On November 4, 2009, the diocese agreed to a $4.24 million lawsuit settlement with Allan Ranta, a victim of sexual abuse by Wayland Y. Brown, a diocese priest.  Boland released this statement:I am sorry for all the pain and suffering experienced by Mr. Ranta and my prayers go out not only to him, but to all victims of child sexual abuse that each may find the healing they seek.Boland reached the mandatory retirement age of 75 on April 25, 2010, and submitted his resignation to Pope Benedict XVI.  It was accepted by the pope on July 19, 2011.

References

External links

Diocese of Savannah
Biography of Bishop Boland

Fordham University alumni
Catholic University of America alumni
Alumni of All Hallows College, Dublin
Irish emigrants to the United States
1935 births
Living people
People from Monkstown, County Cork
Roman Catholic bishops of Savannah, Georgia
Pontifical North American College alumni
People educated at Christian Brothers College, Cork
21st-century Roman Catholic bishops in the United States
American Roman Catholic clergy of Irish descent